Mohammed Al-Jadaan (born 1963) is a commercial lawyer and co-founder of Al-Jadaan and Partners Law Firm who has served as Saudi Arabia's minister of finance since November 2016 and concurrently as acting minister of economy and planning since March 2020. He replaced Ibrahim Al-Assaf in the post.

On 6 March 2020 King Salman issued a royal order, appointing Mohammed Al Jadaan as acting minister of economy and planning in addition to his work as minister of finance replacing Mohammed Al Tuwaijri in the post.

Prior to his appointment as Minister of Finance Mohammed Al-Jadaan was the chairman of Capital Markets Authority where he oversaw the opening of the Tadawul Stock Exchange and the loosening of Saudi's regulatory framework to foreign investors. He also previously served as a special adviser to the board of Morgan Stanley Saudi Arabia.

References

External links
 Minister CV

Mohammed
1963 births
Living people
Finance ministers of Saudi Arabia
Government ministers of Saudi Arabia